The 2020 Lafayette Leopards football team represented Lafayette College in the 2020–21 NCAA Division I FCS football season. The Leopards were led by fourth-year head coach John Garrett and played their home games at Fisher Field. They competed as a member of the Patriot League.

On July 13, 2020, the Patriot League announced that it would cancel its fall sports seasons due to the COVID-19 pandemic. The league announced a spring schedule on February 5, with the first games set to be played on March 13.

Previous season
The Leopards finished the 2019 season 4–8, 4–2 in Patriot League play to finish in second place.

Schedule
Lafayette had games scheduled against Sacred Heart (September 5), Navy (September 12), Penn (September 26), and Harvard (October 17), which were all later canceled before the start of the 2020 season.

References

Lafayette
Lafayette Leopards football seasons
Lafayette Leopards football